Advance and Retreat is the third and final novel in The War Between the Provinces series, a fantasy version of the American Civil War by Harry Turtledove.

Plot
After a long fought out civil war, the Southron forces of the Kingdom of Detina defeat the Northoners and serfdom is abolished throughout all the kingdom.

References

American fantasy novels
Novels by Harry Turtledove
War Between the Provinces
2002 American novels
Baen Books